Bargecheh is a village in Qolqol Rud Rural District, Qolqol Rud District, Tuyserkan County, Hamadan Province, Iran. At the 2006 census, its population was 221, in 51 families.

References 

Populated places in Tuyserkan County